Cambridgea decorata is a species of spiders in the genus Cambridgea found only in New Zealand. It is classified as "data deficient" under the New Zealand Threat Classification System. The only published records are of specimens collected in the 1940s from Parnell (male holotype), and Waiheke Island (females). Both localities are in Auckland.

References

Stiphidiidae
Spiders described in 2000
Spiders of New Zealand
Endemic fauna of New Zealand